The 2018 United States House of Representatives elections in Illinois were held on November 6, 2018, to elect U.S. representatives, one from each of the state's eighteen congressional districts.

The primaries for all parties were held on March 20, 2018. The state congressional delegation changed from an 11–7 Democratic majority to a 13–5 Democratic majority.

Statewide

By district
Results of the 2018 United States House of Representatives elections in Illinois by district:

District 1

Democratic incumbent Bobby Rush has represented the district since 1993. In 2016, he was reelected with 74.10% of the vote.

Democratic primary

Candidates

Declared
 Bobby Rush, incumbent U.S. Representative

Withdrew
 Howard Brookins, Chicago alderman for the 21st Ward

Primary results

Republican primary

Candidates

Declared
 Jimmy Lee Tillman, II, nominee for Illinois's 1st congressional district in 2014 and son of former Chicago alderman Dorothy Tillman

Primary results

General election

Results

District 2

Democratic incumbent Robin Kelly has represented the district since 2013. In 2016, she was reelected with 79.81% of the vote.

Democratic primary

Candidates

Declared
 Robin Kelly, incumbent U.S. Representative
 Marcus Lewis, postal worker, independent candidate for Illinois's 2nd congressional district in 2012 & 2013 and Democratic candidate in 2014 & 2016

Primary results

Republican primary

Candidates

Declared
 Patrick Harmon
 David Merkle
 John Morrow, nominee for Illinois's 2nd congressional district in 2016

Primary results

General election

Results

District 3

Democratic incumbent Dan Lipinski has represented the district since 2005. In 2016, he was reelected against nominal write-in opposition.

Democratic primary

Candidates

Declared
 Dan Lipinski, incumbent U.S. Representative
 Marie Newman, businesswoman and activist

Endorsements

Polling

Primary results

Republican primary
Jewish Republicans called for Cook County Republican Chairman Sean Morrison to resign for failing to recruit any candidate to oppose Art Jones, a self-professed Nazi, Holocaust denier, white nationalist, and white supremacist and who became the Republican nominee.

Candidates

Declared
 Arthur Jones, former chairman of the American Nazi Party, holocaust denier, and white supremacist

Primary results

Other candidates

Write-in

Declared
 Justin Hanson, lawyer and Republican former congressional staffer
 Richard Mayers, perennial candidate and alleged white supremacist congressional candidate in 2000, 2002, 2008, and 2016; 1998 State House candidate; 1993 Berwyn city clerk and city treasurer candidate
 Kenneth Yerkes, dentist

Declined
 Christopher Reilly, Palos Township trustee

General election

Results

District 4

Democratic incumbent Luis Gutiérrez has represented the district since 1993. He was reelected with 79.81% of the vote in 2016.

A day after filing petitions to run for reelection, Gutierrez announced he would not seek re-election in 2018 and retire at the end of his current term.

Democratic primary
Gutierrez's announcement has led multiple Democrats to begin circulating petitions. Jesús "Chuy" García, a member of the Cook County Board of Commissioners, Carlos Ramirez-Rosa, and Proco Joe Moreno, both members of the Chicago City Council, circulated petitions for the nomination. Ramirez-Rosa and Moreno withdrew. Gutiérrez endorsed García.

On November 28, 2017, Richard Gonzalez filed to run for the Democratic nomination.

Candidates

Declared
 Sol Flores, founding executive director of La Casa Norte
 Jesús "Chuy" García, Cook County commissioner for the 7th district
 Richard Gonzalez, Chicago Police Department sergeant

Withdrew
 Raymond Lopez, Chicago city councilman for the 15th ward
 Proco Joe Moreno, Chicago city councilman for the 1st ward
 Carlos Ramirez-Rosa, Chicago city councilman for the 35th ward (endorsed Jesús "Chuy" García)

Endorsements

Polling

Primary results

Republican primary

Candidates

Declared
 Mark Lorch

Primary results

General election

Results

District 5

Democratic incumbent Mike Quigley has represented the district since 2009. He was reelected with 67.84% of the vote in 2016. Per the Illinois Board of Elections, four Democrats and one Republican filed to run in the 5th congressional district.

Democratic primary

Candidates

Declared
 Sameena Mustafa
Mike Quigley, incumbent U.S. Representative
 Steven J. Schwartzberg
 Ben Wolf, former FBI agent

Endorsements

Primary results

Republican primary

Candidates

Declared
 Tom Hanson

Primary results

General election

Results

District 6

Republican incumbent Peter Roskam represented the district since 2007. He was reelected with 59.22% of the vote in 2016 while Democrat Hillary Clinton defeated Republican Donald Trump in the presidential election by a seven-point margin in that district.

Democratic primary
Clinton's victory in the historically Republican district led to a large amount of  Democratic interest. On January 30, 2017, the Democratic Congressional Campaign Committee announced the 6th as one of three Illinois targets.

Candidates

Declared
 Becky Anderson Wilkins, Naperville city councilwoman
 Sean Casten, scientist and former energy business owner
 Carole Cheney, former chief of staff to U.S. Representative Bill Foster and candidate for Illinois House of Representatives in 2012
 Amanda Howland, College of Lake County trustee, nominee for Illinois's 6th congressional district in 2016, candidate for Illinois State Senate in 2012 and candidate for Illinois House of Representatives in 2006 & 2008
 Ryan Huffman, data analyst
 Kelly Mazeski, Barrington Hills planning commissioner and candidate for Illinois State Senate in 2016
 Jennifer Zordani, regulatory attorney and former non-profit president

Withdrew
 Grace Haaf, business owner and former CIA cyber security analyst
 Suzyn Price, former Naperville Board of Education member

Declined
 Geoffrey Petzel, candidate for Illinois's 6th congressional district in 2012
 Jason Snelson, restaurant operations manager
 Austin Songer, U.S. Navy veteran

Endorsements

Primary results

Republican primary

Candidates

Declared
Peter Roskam, incumbent U.S. Representative

Primary results

General election

Debates
Complete radio debate (2 parts): July 1, 2018
Complete TV debate: July 26, 2018

Endorsements

Polling

Results

District 7

Democratic incumbent Danny K. Davis has represented the district since 1997. He was reelected with 84.24% of the vote in 2016.

Democratic primary

Candidates

Declared
 Anthony Clark, high school teacher
 Danny K. Davis, incumbent U.S. Representative

Primary results

Republican primary

Candidates

Declared
 Craig Cameron
 Jeffrey Leef

Primary results

General election

Results

District 8

Democratic incumbent Raja Krishnamoorthi has represented the district since 2017. In 2016, he was elected with 58.3% of the vote. Krishnamoorthi won the Democratic primary, uncontested.

Democratic primary

Candidates

Declared
 Raja Krishnamoorthi, incumbent U.S. Representative

Primary results

Republican primary

Candidates

Declared
 Jitendra "JD" Diganvker, entrepreneur

Primary results

General election

Results

District 9

Democratic incumbent Jan Schakowsky has represented the district since 1999. In 2016, she was reelected with 66.47% of the vote.

Democratic primary

Candidates

Declared
Jan Schakowsky, incumbent U.S. Representative

Primary results

Republican primary

Candidates

Declared
Sargis Sangari, U.S. Army veteran
John D. Elleson, pastor
Maxwell Rice
D. Vincent Thomas, Jr., U.S. Coast Guard veteran

Primary results

General election

Results

District 10

Democratic incumbent Brad Schneider has represented the district since 2017; he previously served one term from 2013 to 2015. In 2016, he was elected with 53.73% of the vote.

Democratic primary
 Brad Schneider, incumbent

Primary results

Republican primary

Candidates

Declared
 Douglas Bennett, computer engineer
Sapan Shah, physician
Jeremy Wynes, midwest director of the American Israel Public Affairs Committee and the Republican Jewish Coalition

Primary results

General election

Results

District 11

Democratic incumbent Bill Foster has represented the district since 2013. He previously served from 2008 to 2011 representing Illinois's 14th congressional district. In 2016, he was reelected with 60.40% of the vote. Foster filed to run for reelection.

Democratic primary

Candidates

Declared
Bill Foster, incumbent U.S. Representative

Primary results

Republican primary

Candidates

Declared
 Nick Stella
 Connor Vlakancic

Primary results

General election

Results

District 12

Republican incumbent Mike Bost has represented the district since 2015. In 2016, he was reelected with 54.31% of the vote.

Democratic primary
On May 22, 2017, the Democratic Congressional Campaign Committee announced the 12th as a target on the list of expanded targets.

Candidates

Declared
 David Bequette, businessman
 Brendan Kelly, St. Clair County state attorney

Withdrew
 Adam King, bartender and former archive technician at the National Archives and Records Administration
 Pat McMahan, Mascoutah city councilman
 Dean Pruitt, businessman, mathematician, and co-founder and former science director of the City Museum
 Chris Miller, businessman
 John Sholar, attorney

Declined
 Nathan Colombo, marketing executive

Primary results

Republican primary

Candidates

Declared
 Mike Bost, incumbent U.S. Representative
 Preston Nelson

Primary results

Green primary

Candidates

Declared
 Randall Auxier, professor of philosophy and communications studies at Southern Illinois University - Carbondale

Primary results

General election

Debates
Complete video of debate, October 23, 2018

Endorsements

Polling

Results

District 13

Republican incumbent Rodney Davis has represented the district since 2013. In 2016, he was reelected with 59.70% of the vote.

Democratic primary
On January 30, 2017, the Democratic Congressional Campaign Committee announced the 13th as one of three Illinois targets.

Candidates

Declared
 Jon Ebel, director of graduate studies in religion at University of Illinois at Urbana–Champaign
 David Gill, physician 
 Erik Jones, former Illinois Assistant Attorney General
 Betsy Dirksen Londrigan, nonprofit executive
 Angel Sides

Withdrew
 Benjamin Webb, teacher

Declined
 Carol Ammons, state representative
 Dillon Clark, Montgomery County board-member

Endorsements

Primary results

Republican primary

Candidates

Declared
 Rodney Davis, incumbent U.S. Representative

Primary results

General election

Polling

Results

District 14

Republican incumbent Randy Hultgren has represented the district since 2011. In 2016, he was reelected with 59.30% of the vote. Hultgren won the Republican primary, uncontested.

Democratic primary
On January 30, 2017, the Democratic Congressional Campaign Committee announced the 14th as one of three Illinois targets.

Candidates

Declared
 Matt Brolley, Montgomery village president
 Victor Swanson, high school teacher
Lauren Underwood, nurse and former senior advisor at the U.S. Department of Health and Human Services
 Jim Walz, nominee for Illinois's 14th congressional district in 2016

Endorsements

Primary results

Republican primary

Candidates

Declared
 Randy Hultgren, incumbent U.S. Representative

Primary results

General election

Endorsements

Polling

Results

District 15

Republican incumbent John Shimkus has served in Congress since 1997. In 2016, he ran unopposed. He ran unopposed for Republican nomination.

Democratic primary

Candidates

Declared
 Carl Spoerer
 Kevin Gaither, teacher

Withdrew
 Anthony March

Primary results

Republican primary

Candidates

Declared
 John Shimkus, incumbent U.S. Representative

Primary results

General election

Results

District 16

Republican incumbent Adam Kinzinger has served in Congress since 2011. In 2016, he was reelected with nominal write-in opposition.

Democratic primary

Candidates

Declared
 Neill Mohammad, healthcare management consultant
 Amy Murri Briel
 Sara Dady, lawyer

Withdrew
 Chris Minelli, attorney

Primary results

Republican primary

Candidates

Declared
 Adam Kinzinger, incumbent U.S. Representative
 James Marter, candidate for U.S. Senate in 2016

Primary results

General election

Polling

Results

District 17

Democratic incumbent Cheri Bustos has represented the district since 2013. After exploring a run for Governor of Illinois, Bustos opted to run for reelection in 2018. She was reelected with 60.31% of the vote in 2016 while Republican Donald Trump defeated Democrat Hillary Clinton in the presidential election by less than a one-point margin in the district.

Democratic primary

Candidates

Declared
 Cheri Bustos, incumbent U.S. Representative

Primary results

Republican primary
On February 8, 2017, the National Republican Congressional Committee announced the 17th as one of its initial targets.

Candidates

Declared
 Bill Fawell, real estate broker

Primary results

General election

Results

District 18

Republican incumbent Darin LaHood has represented the district since 2015. In 2016, he was reelected with 72.13% of the vote.

Democratic primary

Candidates

Declared
 Brian Deters
 Darrel Miller
 Junius Rodriguez, history professor

Primary results

Republican primary

Candidates

Declared
 Darin LaHood, incumbent U.S. Representative
 Donald Rients

Primary results

General election

Results

Notes
Partisan clients

References

External links
Candidates at Vote Smart
Candidates at Ballotpedia
Campaign finance at FEC
Campaign finance at OpenSecrets

Official campaign websites of first district candidates
Bobby Rush (D) for Congress
Jimmy Lee Tillman II (R) for Congress

Official campaign websites of second district candidates
Robin Kelly (D) for Congress

Official campaign websites of third district candidates
Justin Hanson (R) for Congress
Dan Lipinski (D) for Congress
Mateusz Tomkowiak (I) for Congress
Kenneth Yerkes (R) for Congress

Official campaign websites of fourth district candidates
Jesús Chuy García (D) for Congress
Mark Lorch (R) for Congress

Official campaign websites of fifth district candidates
Mike Quigley (D) for Congress

Official campaign websites of sixth district candidates
Sean Casten (D) for Congress
Peter Roskam (R) for Congress

Official campaign websites of seventh district candidates
Craig Cameron (R) for Congress
Danny K. Davis (D) for Congress

Official campaign websites of eighth district candidates
Jitendra Diganvker (R) for Congress
Raja Krishnamoorthi (D) for Congress

Official campaign websites of ninth district candidates
John Elleson (R) for Congress
Jan Schakowsky (D) for Congress

Official campaign websites of tenth district candidates
Doug Bennett (R) for Congress
Brad Schneider (D) for Congress

Official campaign websites of eleventh district candidates
Bill Foster (D) for Congress
Nick Stella, MD (R) for Congress

Official campaign websites of twelfth district candidates
Mike Bost (R) for Congress
Brendan Kelly (D) for Congress

Official campaign websites of thirteenth district candidates
Rodney Davis (R) for Congress
Betsy Dirksen Londrigan (D) for Congress

Official campaign websites of fourteenth district candidates
Randy Hultgren (R) for Congress
Lauren Underwood (D) for Congress

Official campaign websites of fifteenth district candidates
Kevin Gaither (D) for Congress
John Shimkus (R) for Congress

Official campaign websites of sixteenth district candidates
Sara Dady (D) for Congress
Adam Kinzinger (R) for Congress

Official campaign websites of seventeenth district candidates
Cheri Bustos (D) for Congress
Bill Fawell (R) for Congress

Official campaign websites of eighteenth district candidates
Darin LaHood (R) for Congress
Junius Rodriguez (D) for Congress

Illinois
2018
House